Scott Turner (born 31 May 1970) is a former Australian rules football player who played in the AFL between 1991 and 1999 for the Richmond Football Club.

Turner coached Hampden Football League club Warrnambool to premierships in 2000 and 2001. From 2008 to 2010, then again in 2012, Turner was coach of Ararat, his original club.

References

External links
 
 

Living people
Richmond Football Club players
1970 births
Australian rules footballers from Victoria (Australia)
Ararat Football Club players